Girl is a 2018 drama film directed by Lukas Dhont, in his feature debut. It was written by Dhont and Angelo Tijssens and stars Victor Polster, in his acting debut, as a trans girl who pursues a career as a ballerina.

The film screened in the Un Certain Regard section at the 2018 Cannes Film Festival, where it won the Caméra d'Or award, for best first feature film, as well as the Queer Palm, and Polster won the Un Certain Regard Jury Award for Best Performance. It was selected as the Belgian entry for the Best Foreign Language Film at the 91st Academy Awards, although it did not make the December shortlist. It received nine nominations at the 9th Magritte Awards and won four, including Best Screenplay and Best Actor for Polster.

Girl was inspired by Nora Monsecour, a trans female dancer from Belgium, whom Dhont met when he was 18 and she was 15. While initially praised by critics, the film was criticised by some trans and queer writers for its depiction of gender dysphoria and self-harm. Monsecour, who collaborated with Dhont and Tijssens on the film, has defended the film in response.

Plot
Lara Verhaeghen is a fifteen year old transgender girl and aspiring professional ballerina. She applies to a prestigious ballet school in Antwerp, and upon acceptance (contingent on her performance during an eight week trial), she moves to be closer to the school, with her supportive francophone father, Mathias, and younger brother, Milo. During this transitional time, Lara is speaking to doctors about her gender dysphoria, taking puberty blockers and regularly sees a psychiatrist, who is also supportive.

Lara performs well in school, and, despite the public knowledge that she is transgender, her classmates accept her, including using the girls' locker room, but she always uses a private restroom. Against advice, she tucks her penis with tape during practices. Lara's body endures more pain as she trains extensively. Nevertheless, her dedication to ballet and to her external appearance reflecting her gender identity motivate her. Six year old Milo, however, does not adjust as well. Lara is supportive, and not only gets him ready and takes him to school each day but checks in on him from afar.

Time passes, and the doctors are ready to begin Lara's sex reassignment surgery. Although the full process will take two years, Lara eagerly signs the consent documents. Speaking to her psychiatrist later, she states that she does not want to date until she has the "right body". Her psychiatrist, however, tells her to enjoy her puberty as a teenager.

Although she begins hormone replacement therapy in preparation for her surgery, Lara's body does not change fast enough for her. One night, at a sleepover, some classmates bully her, but she leaves and goes home. She finds her father having dinner with his new girlfriend, and tells him she has returned because she has a stomach ache. Matthias does not pressure but brings it up on the way to the doctor the next day. At the appointment, the doctor notes that Lara has lost weight and has a genital infection, and tells Lara that she must stop taping and gain weight, because she has to be physically strong for the operation. Lara insists that she is fine, but her father disagrees.

After a near breakdown in class, Lara finds comfort with a boy in her building, who has shown interest in her. While she kisses him and he kisses back, she prevents him from touching her, and begins to perform oral sex on him but flees. Returning home, Lara instigates an argument with Matthias, who tries to be understanding but Lara refuses to open up.

Studio rehearsals are over and the students move to their first stage practice. Lara barely finishes, then collapses from exhaustion backstage. The next day, she wakes late and tries to leave, but when her father says she hasn't eaten, Lara lashes out and breaks down in tears. Later, at the doctor's office, her doctors tell her that she must stop dancing and regain her strength, otherwise, she will not be able to have the surgery, which is delayed.

At a family dinner some time later, Lara seems better. Some guests comment on how gorgeous she looks in her new dress, and later, she falls asleep cradling Milo. The next day, Matthias takes her coffee in bed before leaving for work and to drop off Milo at school. Lara prepares a bowl of ice, calls emergency services and mutilates her penis with a pair of scissors. Matthias stays at her side in the ambulance and at her bedside. In the final scene, a recovered Lara, with shorter hair, walks determinedly down a street.

Cast
 Victor Polster as Lara Verhaeghen
 Arieh Worthalter as Mathias Verhaeghen
 Olivar Bodart as Milo Verhaeghen 
  as Dr. Naert
  as Dr. Pascal
 Tijmen Govaerts as Lewis

Production

The film was inspired by Nora Monsecour, a professional dancer and trans woman from Belgium. In 2009, Dhont, then 18 and a newly enrolled film student, read a newspaper article about Monsecour's request to her ballet school that she take the girls' class so she could learn en pointe skills. Unlike the protagonist of the film, Monsecour was not accepted to the girls' class, and since shifted her focus from ballet to contemporary dance. Dhont approached Monsecour to make a documentary about her, which she declined. Instead, he then went on to write a fictional narrative film with her and Tijssens, although Monsecour remained uncredited at her wish. Dhont consulted Monsecour, other transgender people and medical professionals for the film. Doctors at Ghent University Hospital, where Monsecour had been a patient, advised against casting a trans girl because she would be in a sensitive period of her transition.

The casting for the lead role was done with no regard to the actors' gender. After failing to find an actor who could both dance and act to their satisfaction among the 500 people aged between 14 and 17 who auditioned (six of whom were trans female), the filmmakers began casting the rest of the dancers who would appear in the film. It was in this group casting process that they found Polster. Monsecour was involved in the casting of Polster and was present on set during the filming. Polster took three months of voice training and of dance practices with pointe shoes. The filming involved nude scenes of Polster, then 14, with his parents' consent. The crew took particular care not to show his face and lower body in the same shot. Sidi Larbi Cherkaoui, artistic director of the Royal Ballet of Flanders, served as choreographer.

Release
Girl premiered in the Un Certain Regard section at the 2018 Cannes Film Festival on 12 May 2018. In May 2018, Netflix acquired the rights to the film for North America and Latin America. While Netflix originally planned to release the film on its platform on 18 January 2019, the release was pushed back to 15 March 2019. Netflix released the film with a warning card, which read, "This film covers sensitive issues, and includes some sexual content, graphic nudity, and an act of self-harm", with a link to a website providing information about The Trevor Project's suicide hotline.

Reception

Critical response
The site's critical consensus reads, "Girl uses one aspiring dancer's story as the framework for a poignant drama that approaches its difficult themes with fittingly alluring grace." On Metacritic, the film has a weighted average score of 73 out of 100, based on 15 critics, indicating "generally favorable reviews".

David Ehrlich of IndieWire called the film "arrestingly empathetic" and gave the film a grade of B+, while expressing a concern over the casting of the cisgender male actor for the role of a trans woman. Peter Debruge of Variety praised Polster's performance and called the film "an intuitively accessible look at a gender nonconforming teenager trying to find the courage to be herself". Boyd van Hoeij of The Hollywood Reporter praised the film's reliance on visuals and editing rather than dialogue, while raising concern about the casting and nudity, which he nonetheless found to be "a logical choice".

Wendy Ide of Screen International called the film "assured and empathetic", saying, "There is a compassion and intimacy to Dhont's approach to gender issues which evokes the work of Céline Sciamma, particularly in Tomboy." Steve Pond of TheWrap described the film as "a quiet movie until it isn't, a gentle character study that goes into extreme territory, a wrenching drama that you think is about finding acceptance until it threatens to become about the impossibility of that very thing", and wrote, "by the end, this quiet movie goes to a place of horrific pain and desperation. ... Dhont manages to find the briefest of grace notes in its aftermath".

Kimber Myers of the Los Angeles Times wrote that the cinematography which focuses on the protagonist's body "feels exploitative, rather than empathetic", and that "it's the irresponsible handling of the film's final, shocking scenes that is the most problematic". Myers concluded, "Dhont's film is a strong debut from a technical angle, but it lacks the humanity necessary for a story of this nature".

Criticism
Girl has been met with criticism from some trans and queer writers, particularly in regard to its depiction of gender dysphoria and self-harm.

Matthew Rodriguez of the Into magazine wrote, "the film is bloody and obsessed with trans bodies in a way that reminds us that a cisgender person wrote and directed it. It's trans trauma porn and, as a cisgender person, I'm warning trans people not to watch it and cis people not to fall for it", and that the shots of the cisgender male actor Polster's genitalia "convey a creepy, voyeuristic obsession with Lara's body that never loses its ick factor. ... Rather than uplifting Lara, the film almost seems to want to humiliate her and lament her struggle." Rodriguez also criticised the casting of Polster despite the character being supposed to be on puberty blockers: "young trans girls on blockers don't look like feminine or androgynous boys—they look like girls. Lara has started taking estrogen, and she is frustrated because her breasts haven't developed. Hormones affect more than breasts, yet the film focuses on breasts and the vagina as the sole things that make a trans girl a girl", while acknowledging some aspects of the film, such as the relationship between Lara and her father and the microaggressions she faces, as "well-wrought".

On the British Film Institute's website, trans female critic Cathy Brennan wrote, "Dhont's camera dwells on the teenage Lara's crotch with a troubling fascination throughout the entire runtime. ... The camera's gaze in Girl belongs to that of a cis person. It fits comfortably into the way cis audiences see people like me. They may smile to my face while wondering what's between my legs." In regard to the ending of the film in which the protagonist mutilates her penis, Brennan wrote, "It's a scene of severe trauma that the film has not earned the right to depict. Dhont's portrayal of gender dysphoria is so focused on the genitals that he offers no insight into the psychological facets of trans girl's psychology. To reduce it down to this one act of self-mutilation is cinematic barbarism."

Writing for The Hollywood Reporter, Oliver Whitney, who identifies as trans masculine, described Girl as "the most dangerous movie about a trans character in years". Whitney criticised the film's "disturbing fascination with trans bodies", writing, "Lara's genitals, shown in multiple full-frontal nude shots of Polster's penis, have a bigger presence throughout Girl and are central to more plot points than the character herself. ... What could have been a thoughtful exploration of a difficult part of a trans girl's daily life instead uses her body as a site of trauma, inviting the audience to react with disgust. Much like the cisgender characters who continually silence Lara and tell her how to feel, the director shows no interest in understanding her internal struggles." Whitney identified the depiction of hormone replacement therapy (HRT) to be the film's largest issue, writing that it "sends the inaccurate message that HRT will cause a trans person more agony" and is "outrageously irresponsible filmmaking", and concluded with a call for further inclusion of transgender people in the film industry, which in his opinion would have prevented the film from getting as much acclaim.

Tre'vell Anderson of the Out magazine also condemned the film's depiction of self-mutilation and lack of "substantive participation of trans voices". GLAAD posted quotations from these critics on Twitter, warning to "read what trans and queer critics are saying". GLAAD also sent out an email asking recipients to attend screenings and share articles critical of the film on social media in order to promote inclusion in the industry. In North America, the lack of early access to the film for critics not in major cities or in award-giving circles was criticised as consequentially diminishing and delaying opportunities for queer critics to voice their opinions.

The film was also met with criticism from the trans community in Belgium and France. The critics found the film to be fixated on physical, especially genital, aspects of transitioning when, according to Camille Pier, project manager at Brussels association network RainbowHouse, other factors such as administrative complications, environment, respect to human rights, and being a minor can pose more pressing problems. Researcher Héloïse Guimin-Fati described the film as having a "cis-centred" and "terribly masculine" vision, and said that "the character of Lara became an object when she should have been the subject of the film". They also found the film's emphasis on the protagonist's suffering and isolation and her not seeking help from the trans community despite having a supportive father and living in modern Belgium incongruous and perpetuating stereotypes. Londé Ngosso, director of Belgian organisation Genres Pluriels, said, "This does not take into account the reality of the country, social networks, the commitment of young people, all of the work we've done for eleven years. It makes us invisible instead of putting us forward."

In response to the criticism, Nora Monsecour, the dancer who inspired the film, defended the film in The Hollywood Reporter, writing, "Girl is not a representation of all transgender experiences, but rather a retelling of experiences that I faced during my journey. ... Girl tells my story in a way that doesn't lie, doesn't hide. To argue that Lara's experience as trans is not valid because Lukas is cis or because we have a cis lead actor offends me." In a subsequent interview with IndieWire, Monsecour repeated that she was "offended", saying, "My story is not a fantasy of the cis director. Lara's story is my story." She also stated that she viewed the self-mutilation at the end of the film as "a metaphor for suicidal thoughts or dark thoughts that are taking over, which I experienced myself", and that it was "crucial to show", adding, "The scene should not be interpreted [as] encouraging trans youth to cut certain body parts off themselves. That is not the message. The message is to show that these things are a result of dark thoughts, [which] are the result of the struggle that we face." In another interview, Monsecour told The New York Times, "The words people have used to describe Girl came close to my heart because the scenes they are criticizing are scenes that I had in mind during my transition. To criticize Lukas for portraying those things made me think, am I the only person who had suicidal thoughts or was bodily focused?"

Dhont responded to the criticism by saying, "We wanted to show this young trans girl in the world of the ballet, which is very binary, and her struggling with that. ... Not everyone can always like everything. I really am someone who wants to see trans directors directing trans stories, and someone that wants to see trans actors playing trans parts, any part. But let's not fight for inclusion by the tool of exclusion. Let's fight for inclusion by having everyone at the table."

Writing for The Advocate, Ann Thomas, the founder of a trans talent agency, defended the film, attributing the casting of the cis male actor to the lack of young trans actors working in Europe at the time of the pre-production, and described the film's portrayals as accurate. Non-binary dancer Chase Johnsey found the film's focus on the protagonist's physicality to be consistent with his experience as a ballet dancer, and said, "The struggles that trans and gender-fluid people often have in the ballet world are with their body, because it's a body-oriented art form." Phia Ménard, a French transgender director and performer, also found the film consistent with her experience, and the self-mutilation in the film comparable to teenage suicidal impulse.

Netflix was reported to be working with GLAAD and considering adding a warning to accompany the film, which Dhont has said he would endorse. In January 2019, The New York Times reported that Netflix had reached out to organisations for suggestions on how to word the warning. In December 2018, Netflix organised a screening of the film in Los Angeles to which queer and trans people were invited.

Accolades

See also
 List of submissions to the 91st Academy Awards for Best Foreign Language Film
 List of Belgian submissions for the Academy Award for Best Foreign Language Film

References

External links
 

2018 films
2018 drama films
2010s dance films
2018 LGBT-related films
2010s teen drama films
Belgian drama films
Belgian LGBT-related films
Caméra d'Or winners
Dutch drama films
Dutch LGBT-related films
Dutch-language films
European Film Awards winners (films)
Films about ballet
Films directed by Lukas Dhont
Films shot in Antwerp
Films shot in Brussels
Films about trans women
LGBT-related drama films
Teen LGBT-related films
Magritte Award winners
Queer Palm winners
Film controversies in Belgium
Film controversies in the Netherlands
LGBT-related controversies in film